Maniçoba is a festive dish in Brazilian cuisine, especially from the Amazonian region state of Pará and Bahia. It is of indigenous origin, and is made with leaves of the Manioc plant that have been finely ground and boiled for at least four days and up to a week, to remove their hydrogen cyanide content. The ground and boiled leaves (maniva) are then mixed with salted pork, dried meat and other smoked ingredients, such as bacon and sausage. The dish is served with rice and cassava meal (farinha). Maniçoba is usually eaten during the Círio de Nazaré, a religious festival that takes place in October in the city of Belém.

In Sergipe, the Museu da Gente Sergipana mentions the importance of maniçoba for the cities of Lagarto and Simão Dias, a tradition passed from father to son, starting with a local merchant named João Mendes and passing to his son Rildo Mendes, known as Gordinho da Maniçoba, where maniçoba is a traditional dish of festivities.

See also
 List of Brazilian dishes

References

External links 
 Brazilian tourism board

Brazilian cuisine
Pork dishes
Cassava dishes
Native American cuisine